Ronald Sorvaag is an American politician. He serves as a Republican member of the North Dakota Senate and has served as a state senator since 2011. He earned a B.A. in Sociology from Concordia College, has a wife Carla and two children.

References

Year of birth missing (living people)
Living people
Republican Party North Dakota state senators
21st-century American politicians
Place of birth missing (living people)